Lenka Kebrlová (born 13 March 1966, in Rakovník) is a Czech former alpine skier who competed for Czechoslovakia in the 1988 Winter Olympics.

References

External links
 

1966 births
Living people
Czech female alpine skiers
Czechoslovak female alpine skiers
Olympic alpine skiers of Czechoslovakia
Alpine skiers at the 1988 Winter Olympics
Universiade medalists in alpine skiing
People from Rakovník
Universiade gold medalists for Czechoslovakia
Competitors at the 1987 Winter Universiade
Sportspeople from the Central Bohemian Region